Point of Rocks may refer to:

In the United States (sorted by state):
Point of Rocks (California), a promontory overlooking the Mojave River in San Bernardino County, California
Point of Rocks (Kansas), a promontory landmark on the Santa Fe Trail
Point of Rocks (Kern County, California), a mountain range in Kern County
Point of Rocks, Maryland, a town on the Potomac River
Point of Rocks (MARC station), listed on the National Register of Historic Places (NRHP) in Frederick County, Maryland
Point of Rocks Historic District, a promontory landmark on the Santa Fe Trail, listed on the NRHP in Colfax County, New Mexico
Point of Rocks (Sierra County, New Mexico), landmark along the Jornada del Muerto
Point of Rocks (Chester, Virginia), listed on the NRHP in Chesterfield County, Virginia
Point of Rocks (Texas), an isolated hill with a spring, a watering place on the San Antonio - El Paso Road, 10 miles west of Fort Davis, Texas, now a roadside park
Point of Rocks (Baraboo, Wisconsin), a rock formation on the NRHP
Point of Rocks, Wyoming, an unincorporated community in Sweetwater County
Point of Rocks Stage Station, listed on the NRHP in Sweetwater County, Wyoming